Food of the Gods II, sometimes referred to as Gnaw: Food of the Gods II as well as Food of the Gods Part 2, is a 1989 Canadian science fiction film that is a very loose sequel to the 1976 Bert I. Gordon film The Food of the Gods, based on the 1904 H.G. Wells novel of the same name. It is a sequel in name only, as its plot bears no relation to the 1976 film.

The main themes of the film are animal testing and size change. In the film, a growth serum is tested on lab rats, turning them into giants. While the animals rampage, the use of the same serum on cancer cells causes massive tumors.

Plot 
Dr. Neil Hamilton (Paul Coufos) receives a call from his mentor Dr. Kate Travis (Jackie Burroughs) about a young boy named Bobby, whose deficient growth has been treated with Travis' experimental serum. Bobby has swiftly and unexpectedly grown larger than a full-grown adult and become violent. To find an antidote, Neil takes a sample of the serum back to his lab at a university science complex. There, animal-rights activists led by Mark Hales (Réal Andrews) and Neil's girlfriend Alex Reed (Lisa Schrage) are protesting the work of Prof. Edmund Delhurst (Colin Fox), who claims to study cancer but in fact subjects animals to experimentation seeking a cure for baldness.

Neil and his assistant Joshua (Frank Pellegrino) inject the serum into some lab rats. That night, the activists (minus Alex) break into the complex to trash Delhurst's lab and accidentally release the now-giant rats, which kill Mark and escape into the campus' utility tunnels. Police Lieutenant Weizel (Michael Copeman) does not believe the surviving activists' statements despite Neil's corroboration about the serum, and Dean White (David B. Nichols) hires a pair of exterminators to handle what he believes are normal-sized rats.

The giant rats kill several people, including one of the exterminators; the surviving activists, Al and Angie, escape. But the giant rats apparently kill whoever tried to hunt down the animals themselves. Delhurst's assistant, a janitor named Zeke, is attacked, but the surviving exterminator, despite taking several bites to his arms and face, appears and burns the rat. Later, a night watchman tries to escape some rats, though he is killed off-screen.  Alex discovers the body of a workman (a man forced from his car and chased by rats) while two other men killed by the rats, whose bodies are still in the car, are discovered by the police. Although Lieutenant Weizel is convinced of the threat, Dean White remains skeptical and refuses to shut down the campus, due to the upcoming grand opening of the university's new sports complex. When Joshua falls victim to the rats, Neil attacks the Dean and is fired.

Delhurst steals the serum sample and tests it, first on Neil's pet rat Louise, then on a sample of cancer cells. He accidentally contaminates himself with treated cells and dies within minutes as his entire body develops massive tumors. Neil returns to the lab to retrieve the antidote he has created, testing it by destroying Delhurst's transformed corpse. Meanwhile, the rats attack the swim competition being held in the new sports complex, killing several people, including Dean White.

Neil uses the enlarged but still-docile Louise, who is in heat, to lure the giant (male) rats into the university courtyard, where Weizel and his men gun them all down. Neil phones Dr. Travis to inform her of the antidote, but it is too late; Bobby, now psychotic and larger than ever, kills Travis while she is on the phone and escapes.

Cast

Reception 
Creature Feature gave the film two out of five stars, finding the effects ludicrous. Paul Lê of Bloody Disgusting said of the film, "As positively junky and sleazy as Gnaw: Food of the Gods II is, it is also immensely fun. The dead-serious tone clashes with the film’s fundamentally preposterous nature, and the audience laughs when the actors themselves cannot. The story gets odder with every passing minute, and the overall execution is bewildering. Even after all the skewering, this sequel still manages to outdo the original in some respects. How it goes about doing so would never be accepted as “good” in critic circles, but among B-movie fans, Gnaw is a treasure trove of absurdity and mindless entertainment."

References

External links 
 
 

1989 films
English-language Canadian films
Films based on works by H. G. Wells
Giant monster films
New Line Cinema films
Carolco Pictures films
1989 horror films
Films about size change
Canadian sequel films
Films directed by Damian Lee
Canadian science fiction horror films
1980s science fiction horror films
Films about giants
Canadian natural horror films
Films produced by Damian Lee
Films about mice and rats
Films about animal testing
Films about cancer
1980s English-language films
1980s Canadian films